al-Mansûr ibn Buluggin  (died 995) was the second ruler of the Zirids in Ifriqiya (r. 984–995).

Life 
Al-Mansur succeeded his father Buluggin ibn Ziri (r. 972–984) in Ifriqiya. Despite further campaigns by the Zirids against the Berber tribes of Morocco, he was forced to abandon the attempt at a permanent conquest of Fez and Sijilmasa. Still, he was able to consolidate Zirid rule in the central Maghreb when he defeated the Kutama Berbers in 988, and when his brother Hammad ibn Buluggin, as governor of Algeria, drove the Zanata Berbers into Morocco. The vassal relationship to the Fatimids became increasingly loose under al-Mansur, not least because their focus of attention was on the overthrow of the Abbasids in Iraq. 

He was succeeded by Badis ibn al-Mansur (996–1016).

995 deaths
Zirid emirs of Ifriqiya
Tunisian Shia Muslims
Year of birth unknown
10th-century Berber people
10th-century rulers in Africa
Vassal rulers of the Fatimid Caliphate
10th-century people of Ifriqiya